"Vi gör det ändå" is a song by the Swedish duo Samir & Viktor. The song was released in Sweden as a digital download on 14 July 2017. The song peaked at number 26 on the Swedish Singles Chart.

Music video
A music video to accompany the release of "Vi gör det ändå" was first released onto YouTube on 14 July 2017 at a total length of three minutes and fifteen seconds.

Track listing

Charts

Release history

References

2017 songs
2017 singles
Samir & Viktor songs
Warner Music Group singles